Rodolfo Dantas Bispo (born 23 October 1982) is a Brazilian football coach and a former player who played center-back or central midfielder. He is an assistant coach with the Russian club FC Akhmat Grozny.

Career

Club
Rodolfo joined Fluminense of Rio de Janeiro, a traditional rival state in football. While at Fluminense, he played against future teammate Kléber at Copa Sudamericana.

Rodolfo joined Dynamo Kyiv in July 2004.

Rodolfo joined Lokomotiv Moscow in January 2007.
After Bilyaletdinov's departure to Everton, Rodolfo took his role and was appointed Lokomotiv's new captain.

On 6 March 2015, Rodolfo joined FC Terek Grozny.

On 27 May 2019, FC Akhmat Grozny announced the retirement of Rodolfo as a player and that he will join club's coaching staff.

International
Rodolfo is capped for Brazil in 2004 CONMEBOL Men Pre-Olympic Tournament.

Style of Play
Rodolfo's style of play resembles that of his hero, Brazilian captain Lucio. As with Lucio style, Rodolfo also contributes in attack by frequently making long runs into the opponent's half using his technique and speed to full effect. Rodolfo is not shy in front of the net and has scored many important goals for Lokomotiv. He also possesses a good long shot.

Career statistics

Club

Notes

Honours
Fluminense
Campeonato Carioca: 2002

Dynamo Kyiv
Ukrainian Cup (2): 2004–05, 2005–06
Ukrainian Super Cup (2): 2005, 2006

Lokomotiv Moscow
Russian Cup (1): 2006–07

References

External links
 
 
 Brazilian FA database 
 
 eng.fclm.ru
 

1982 births
Living people
Sportspeople from Santos, São Paulo
Brazilian footballers
Brazilian expatriate footballers
Fluminense FC players
FC Dynamo Kyiv players
FC Lokomotiv Moscow players
Grêmio Foot-Ball Porto Alegrense players
CR Vasco da Gama players
Association football defenders
Expatriate footballers in Ukraine
Expatriate footballers in Russia
Campeonato Brasileiro Série A players
Ukrainian Premier League players
Russian Premier League players
Brazilian expatriate sportspeople in Ukraine
Brazilian expatriate sportspeople in Russia
FC Akhmat Grozny players